Robert Edwin Gross (born August 3, 1953) is an American retired professional basketball player. A 6'6" (1.98 m) 200 lb (91 kg) forward, he attended Seattle University and California State University, Long Beach, and was selected in the 1975 NBA draft by the Portland Trail Blazers. He was also selected in the 1975 ABA Draft by the San Diego Sails. Gross was the starting small forward for the Blazers during their only championship season (1976–77).  He left the NBA in 1983 with career averages of 8.9 points, 4.4 rebounds, 2.9 assists and 1.12 steals a game.

Currently living in the Portland area, Gross' number 30 jersey was retired on December 18, 2008 during the Trail Blazers' home game against the Phoenix Suns. Since his retirement from basketball, he has been in the construction business.

References

External links
NBA stats @ basketballreference.com

1953 births
Living people
American men's basketball players
Basketball players from Los Angeles
Long Beach State Beach men's basketball players
National Basketball Association players with retired numbers
People from San Pedro, Los Angeles
Portland Trail Blazers draft picks
Portland Trail Blazers players
San Diego Clippers players
San Diego Sails draft picks
Seattle Redhawks men's basketball players
Small forwards
Basketball players from Portland, Oregon